"Valentine" is a song by British band T'Pau, which was released in 1988 as the fifth single from their debut studio album Bridge of Spies. It was written by Ronnie Rogers and Carol Decker, and produced by Roy Thomas Baker. It reached No. 9 in the UK and remained on the charts for eight weeks.

A promotional video was filmed to promote the single, directed by Brian Grant. The single's B-side, "Giving My Love Away", was exclusive to the single. For the 12" vinyl and CD versions of the single, a bonus cover version of "I'm a Believer" was included, which featured Rogers on lead vocal.

Speaking to Songfacts in 2015, Decker revealed of the song: "I wrote it about an ex of mine. We would bump into each other after we split and he'd moved on and had a nice girlfriend. We'd smile and say "Hi," but I was still crazy about him so I always had to hide how I felt, and be cool and casual."

In 1993, the song re-entered the charts and reached No. 53 when it was re-issued to promote the compilation Heart and Soul – The Very Best of T'Pau.

Critical reception
Upon release, Karen Swayne of Number One wrote: "This is classic T'Pau – epic, dramatic and incredibly important sounding – and shouldn't harm their career one little bit." Tom Hibbert of Smash Hits commented: "There were some irritating number ones in 1987, but T'Pau's "China in Your Hand" took the biscuit, didn't it? This is not much better. In fact, it's almost entirely the same, though, thankfully, a little less hysterical. Quite bad."

Formats

Original release
7" single
"Valentine" – 3:53
"Giving My Love Away" – 3:10

12" single
"Valentine" – 3:55
"Giving My Love Away" – 3:19
"I'm A Believer" – 3:24

CD single
"Valentine" – 3:53
"Giving My Love Away" – 3:10
"I'm A Believer" – 3:24
"China in Your Hand (Live)" – 5:49

1993 re-issue
7" single
"Valentine"
"China in Your Hand (Live)"

Cassette single
"Valentine"
"China in Your Hand (Live)"

CD single
"Valentine"
"Heart and Soul (Live)"
"China in Your Hand (Live)"
"Sex Talk (Live)"

Chart performance
Original release

1993 re-issue

Personnel
T'Pau
 Carol Decker – lead vocals
 Dean Howard – lead guitar
 Ronnie Rogers – rhythm guitar
 Michael Chetwood – keyboards
 Paul Jackson – bass guitar
 Tim Burgess – drums, percussion

Production
 Roy Thomas Baker – producer of "Valentine"
 Jerry Napier – engineer on "Valentine"
 Ronnie Rogers, Tim Burgess – producers of "Giving My Love Away" and "I'm a Believer"
 Norman Goodman – engineer on "Giving My Love Away"

Other
 Mark Millington – design
 Simon Fowler – photography
 MI5 – management

References

External links

1988 songs
1988 singles
1993 singles
T'Pau (band) songs
Virgin Records singles
Songs written by Ron Rogers
Songs written by Carol Decker
Song recordings produced by Roy Thomas Baker